al-Midya is a Palestinian village in the Ramallah and al-Bireh Governorate in the western West Bank, located  west of Ramallah. According to the Palestinian Central Bureau of Statistics, the village had a population of over 1,301 inhabitants in 2007.

Location
It is bordered by Ni'lin  to the east and north, the Green Line (the Armistice Line 1949)  to the west, and Saffa  to the south.

History

The ancient village site is located at Ras al-Midya, S-E of the village, where pottery from the Iron Age and later periods has been found. Al-Midya was apparently mentioned by Ishtori Haparchi during the Mamluk era.

Ottoman era

Al-Midya was incorporated into the Ottoman Empire in 1517 with all of Palestine, and in the 1596 tax−records it appeared under the name of Midya as-Sarqiyya as being in the Nahiya of Ramla, part of Gaza Sanjak. It had a population of 25 Muslim households and paid a fixed tax rate of 25% on wheat, barley, summer crops or olives or fruit trees, and a press for olives or grapes; a total of 6,500 akçe.

In 1870, Victor Guérin visited, and thought that ruins found there were the graves of the Maccabees. However, Clermont-Ganneau made extensive excavations later, and he found Christian crosses in the oldest part of the largest structure. He concluded the ruins were from the 5th century or later, that is, from the Byzantine era.

An official Ottoman village list of about 1870 showed that el-medje had a total of 42 houses and a population of 159, though the population count included men only. It also noted that it was located half an hour east of Jimzu.

In 1882, PEF's Survey of Western Palestine  described  Midieh as being a village of a "good size", with houses either built of adobe or stone. To the north was a small olive grove, to the south a tank. The most "peculiar feature" they found was named er Ras. It was a high conical knoll, with a maqam on top, and rock-cut tombs on the side.

British Mandate era
In the 1922 census of Palestine conducted by the British Mandate authorities, Midya had an all Muslim population of 245, increasing in the 1931 census to 286, still all Muslim, in 59 houses.

In the 1945 statistics, the population of el Midya was 320 Muslims, who owned 7,020 dunams of land according to an official land and population survey. Of this, 688 dunams were plantations and irrigable land, 2,304 for cereals, while 8 dunams were built-up (urban) land.

Jordanian era
In the wake of the 1948 Arab–Israeli War, and after the 1949 Armistice Agreements, al-Midya came under Jordanian rule. 

The Jordanian census of 1961 found 570 inhabitants.

1967-present
Since the Six-Day War in 1967, al-Midya  has been under Israeli occupation.

According to the Applied Research Institute–Jerusalem, Al-Midya's total land area was 6,959 dunams in 1942, but after 1948 most of the village's western land was expropriated, leaving 892 dunams, of which 217 were classified as built-up (urban) areas.

In 1986, when the population amounted to 570 people, largely dependent on agriculture, the villagers were woken at 3:00 a.m. by the arrival of Israeli military vehicles and were informed that a curfew would be in place until 9 pm that day. Throughout the day, roughly 1,000 Israelis, soldiers protecting the operation and workers from the Israeli Lands Administration  and Nature Reserve authorities who drove bulldozers to grade a road down a steep hillside to a rough track running below it, and chainsawed an olive grove extending over 1,100 dunams, destroying 3,000 trees. When the devastation was reported, Israel said the razing was to block Al-Midya from encroaching on Israeli state land, claiming that the olive trees were less than five years old, and planted to secure title to the area. Most cut trunks were over half a metre in diameter, suggesting centuries of growth.

After the 1995 accords, 7.4% of village land was classified as Area B, the remainder 92.6% as Area C. Israel has confiscated 186 dunams of land from Al-Midya for the construction of the Israeli settlement of Hashmonaim.

On 3 June 2022, a 17 year-old Palestinian by the name of Odeh Mohammed Odeh was shot dead by IDF personnel in the village.

Archaeology
Excavations near Midya in the 19th century suggested that graves of the Maccabees were located here. Seven triangular tombs were found corresponding with the description of the first-century Jewish historian Josephus Flavius, who wrote that the family’s seven pyramid-shaped graves were erected in the same place. In 1870, an ancient structure near the gravesite of Sheikh al-Arabawi, adjacent to al-Midya, was identified as a Hasmonean grave, but this was rejected by another biblical archaeologist, Charles Clermont-Ganneau. Further exploration by the Israel Antiquities Authority in the 21st century suggest the likelihood that Horbat Sheikh Gharbawi (Horbat Ha-Gardi) is the family tomb of the Maccabees, or marking the alleged tomb in the Byzantine era.

References

Bibliography

 
 (p. 341 ff, pic.)
 p. 834-5? 
 

 
 

 

  
   (pp.  235 239)

External links
Welcome To al-Midya
Survey of Western Palestine, Map 14:  IAA, Wikimedia commons 
Al Midya Village (Fact Sheet), Applied Research Institute–Jerusalem (ARIJ)
Al Midya Village Profile, ARIJ
Al Midya aerial photo, ARIJ

Villages in the West Bank
Municipalities of the State of Palestine